Jean-Claude Rudaz (born 23 July 1942 in Sion) is a former racing driver from Switzerland. He made one attempt at a World Championship Formula One Grand Prix, at the 1964 Italian Grand Prix with a non-works Cooper T60, run by Fabre Urbain. He blew his engine in practice and was unable to start the race, despite qualifying 20th of the 25 entrants.

He also participated in the 1964 24 Hours of Le Mans.

After racing, he founded the Transvalair airline in 1973, which now specialises in freight forwarding and cargo handling.

Complete Formula One World Championship results
(key)

Non-Championship
(key)

References
 "The Grand Prix Who's Who", Steve Small, 1995.
 "The Formula One Record Book", John Thompson, 1974.

1942 births
Swiss Formula One drivers
Swiss racing drivers
Living people
24 Hours of Le Mans drivers
World Sportscar Championship drivers
People from Sion, Switzerland
Sportspeople from Valais